Stewart O'Neal Bolen (October 13, 1902 – August 30, 1969) was an American professional baseball pitcher who played four seasons in Major League Baseball, in 1926 and 1927 with the St. Louis Browns and the Philadelphia Phillies in 1931 and 1932.

External links
 Baseball Reference

1902 births
Baseball players from Alabama
People from Jackson, Alabama
Major League Baseball pitchers
Philadelphia Phillies players
St. Louis Browns players
1969 deaths